Joan Aitor Osorio Marti (born 31 October 1975) is an Andorran swimmer who competed at the 1996 Summer Olympics.

Biography 
Osorio was 20 years old when he represented his country at the 1996 Summer Olympics, he competed in the 200 metre butterfly event, he swam his heat in 2:12.59 minutes and finished 42nd overall so didn't qualify for the finals.

Osorio would later become the president of the Andorran Swimming Federation.

Notes

References

External links
 
 

1975 births
Living people
Andorran male swimmers
Olympic swimmers of Andorra
Swimmers at the 1996 Summer Olympics